This is a gallery of international and national flags used in Asia.

Supranational and international flags
An incomplete list of flags representing intra-Asian international and supranational organisations, which omits intercontinental organisations such as the United Nations:

Flags of Asian sovereign states

Disputed or partially recognised states

Flags of Asian dependencies

Flags of Asian sub-divisions

China

Georgia

Iraq

Japan

Korea

Philippines

Russia

Uzbekistan

Flags of Asian cities

Flags of cities with over 1 million inhabitants.

Historical flags

Notes

See also
 Flags of Africa
 Flags of Europe
 Flags of Oceania
 Flags of North America
 Flags of South America

 Lists of flags of Asian countries
 List of Afghan flags
 List of Armenian flags
 List of Azerbaijani flags
 List of Bangladeshi flags
 List of Bhutanese flags
 List of Bruneian flags
 List of Cambodian flags
 List of Chinese flags
 List of Cypriot flags
 List of East Timorese flags
 List of Egyptian flags
 List of flags of Georgia (country)
 List of Indian flags
 List of flags of Indonesia
 List of Iranian flags
 List of flags of Iraq
 List of flags of Israel
 List of Japanese flags
 List of Kazakh flags
 List of North Korean flags
 List of South Korean flags
 List of Kuwaiti flags
 List of Kyrgyz flags
 List of flags of Laos
 List of Malaysian flags
 List of flags of the Maldives
 List of Mongolian flags
 List of Burmese flags
 List of flags of Nepal
 List of Omani flags
 List of Pakistani flags
 List of Palestinian flags
 List of flags of the Philippines
 List of Qatari flags
 List of Russian flags
 List of Saudi Arabian flags
 List of Singaporean flags
 List of Sri Lankan flags
 List of Taiwanese flags
 List of Thai flags
 List of Turkish flags
 List of Turkmen flags
 List of Uzbek flags
 List of flags of Vietnam

 
Asia
Symbols of Asia
Asia